Odontomacrurus murrayi, the roundhead grenadier, is a bathypelagic or mesopelagic species of rattail. The fish is widespread in the mid-waters of the eastern Atlantic Ocean from north of the Azores to South Africa. It also occurs in the Indian Ocean and in the southwest Pacific.  This species grows to a length of  TL. The remains of fish have been sampled from the stomach contents of specimens. This species is the only member of its genus.

References
 

Macrouridae
Monotypic fish genera
Fish described in 1939